This is a list of notable cemeteries in New York City.

Manhattan 
 African Burial Ground National Monument, Civic Center
 First Shearith Israel Graveyard (Chatham Square Cemetery), Chinatown
 New York Marble Cemetery, East Village, the oldest non-sectarian cemetery in New York City
 New York City Marble Cemetery, East Village, the second oldest non-sectarian cemetery in New York City.
 Saint Bartholomew's Episcopal Church, Midtown Manhattan 
 St. John's Burying Ground
 Second Shearith Israel Cemetery, West Village
 Third Shearith Israel Cemetery, Chelsea
 Trinity Church Cemetery, Financial District

Brooklyn 
 Cypress Hills Cemetery, Cypress Hills 
 Flatbush African Burial Ground, Flatbush
 Friends Quaker Cemetery, Windsor Terrace 
 Green-Wood Cemetery 
 Holy Cross Cemetery, East Flatbush
 Maimonides Cemetery, Cypress Hills
 Mount Hope Cemetery, Cypress Hills
 Salem Fields Cemetery, Cypress Hills
 Washington Cemetery, Mapleton

Brooklyn and Queens 
 Beth Olam Cemetery, Brooklyn and Queens
 Cemetery of the Evergreens and Queens

Queens 
 Acacia Cemetery, Ozone Park
 Bayside Cemetery, Ozone Park
 Beth El Cemetery (New Union Field), Ridgewood 
 Calvary Cemetery, Woodside 
 Cedar Grove Cemetery, Flushing
 Cold Springs Cemetery, near Carlisle Gardens
 Flushing Cemetery, Flushing
 Hungarian Union Field Cemetery, Glendale
 Knollwood Park Cemetery, Ridgewood
 Linden Hill Cemetery, Ridgewood
 Lutheran All Faiths Cemetery, Middle Village
 Machpelah Cemetery, Ridgewood
 Maple Grove Cemetery, Kew Gardens
 Mokom Sholom Cemetery, Ozone Park
 Montefiore Cemetery, Springfield Gardens
 Moore-Jackson Cemetery, Woodside
 Mount Carmel Cemetery, Glendale
 Mount Hebron Cemetery, Flushing
 Mount Judah Cemetery, Ridgewood
 Mount Lebanon Cemetery, Ridgewood
 Mount Neboh Cemetery, Glendale
 Mount Olivet Cemetery, Maspeth
 Mount St. Mary’s Cemetery, Flushing
 Mount Zion Cemetery (Elmweir), Maspeth 
 New Mount Carmel Cemetery, Glendale
 Remsen Cemetery, Whitepot
 St. John Cemetery, Middle Village 
 St. Michael's Cemetery, East Elmhurst
 Union Field, Ridgewood

The Bronx 
 Hart Island
 St. Peter's Church, Chapel, and Cemetery, Westchester Square
 Saint Raymond's Cemetery, Throggs Neck 
 West Farms Soldiers Cemetery, West Farms
 Woodlawn Cemetery, Woodlawn

Staten Island 
 Baron Hirsch Cemetery
 Cemetery of the Resurrection
 Moravian Cemetery, New Dorp 
 Mount Richmond Cemetery, Richmondtown (second cemetery of the Hebrew Free Burial Association 
 Ocean View Cemetery, Richmondtown
 Saint Peter's Cemetery, West New Brighton.  Oldest Catholic Cemetery on Staten Island, dating from 1848.
 Silver Lake Cemetery, Silver Lake (first cemetery of the Hebrew Free Burial Association)
 United Hebrew Cemetery, Richmondtown

See also
 List of cemeteries in New York
 List of cemeteries in the United States

References

New York City
 
New York City
Cemeteries